Danny Stephen Bailey (born 21 May 1964) is an English retired professional footballer.

Early career
He began his career as an apprentice with AFC Bournemouth, turning professional and making his league debut in the 1980–81 season. After only one further league appearance for Bournemouth, he dropped out of league football, joining Dagenham.

He later joined Walthamstow Avenue, from whom he joined Torquay United on a free transfer in March 1984. His only league appearance for the Gulls came during the 1983–84 season, a 2–1 defeat away to Hartlepool United on 17 March.

Later career
In 1984, Bailey moved to Grays Athletic. He subsequently joined Wealdstone from Wembley and in August 1989, returned to league football with Exeter City, again on a free transfer.

His career took off, quickly establishing himself in the side, and after 64 league games, in which he scored two goals, he moved to Reading in December 1990 for a fee of £50,000 as the first signing under new owner John Madejski. In his first season and a half at Reading, he played 50 league games, scoring twice. However, out of the first team at the beginning of the 1992–93 season, he was loaned to Fulham making three league appearances.

Still unable to break back into the Reading line-up, he returned to Exeter City on a free transfer in December 1992, and quickly re-established himself at St. James Park. In the summer of 1997, he was released after 152 further league appearances in which he scored four goals.

He joined Farnborough Town, beginning a journey around various non-league sides, quickly moving on to Slough Town in the 1997 close season. He remained at Slough until the end of the 1997–98 season, scoring one goal in the FA Trophy, but was one of many players sacked during a summer that saw Slough in deep financial trouble and eventually voted out of the Conference.

He joined Telford United on a short-term contract on 21 August 1998, with the emphasis on the short-term. He moved to Forest Green Rovers in September 1998, playing in the 1999 FA Trophy final, at which time "Non-League on the Net" reported that he was based in London, where he owned his own fitness centre. In the close-season of 1999 he was released by Forest Green, joining Welling United on 29 July 1999.

"The Kentish Times" linked him with moves to Basingstoke Town in December 1999, and Crawley Town in January 2000, however he remained at Welling and was released in the summer of 2000. In September 2000 he returned on a free transfer to play for Forest Green Rovers. In December 2000, he left Forest Green for a second time, moving to Aylesbury United, though he stayed only a few months at Aylesbury, moving to Grays Athletic in February 2001.

He later played for Weston-super-Mare before joining Bath City in March 2002. He was released at the end of the season and joined Redbridge from where he joined Weymouth in November 2002, playing regularly until the end of the season. He was without a club from August 2003 to November 2003 when he joined Chippenham Town.

He later played for Stansted from where he joined Chesham United in December 2005, playing nine times until mid-February.

He later joined Ware.

In March 2008 he was coach at Potters Bar Town.

Coaching career
He founded with his brother the Bailey Football Academy, which was established in East London, with the men's team "Elite" and the women's "International" team.
Danny also coached MTG Turkish league team.

Honours
Individual
PFA Team of the Year: 1989–90 Fourth Division

References

External links

1964 births
Living people
People from Leyton
English footballers
Association football midfielders
AFC Bournemouth players
Dagenham F.C. players
Walthamstow Avenue F.C. players
Torquay United F.C. players
Grays Athletic F.C. players
Wembley F.C. players
Wealdstone F.C. players
Exeter City F.C. players
Reading F.C. players
Fulham F.C. players
Farnborough F.C. players
Slough Town F.C. players
Telford United F.C. players
Forest Green Rovers F.C. players
Welling United F.C. players
Aylesbury United F.C. players
Weston-super-Mare A.F.C. players
Bath City F.C. players
Weymouth F.C. players
Chippenham Town F.C. players
Stansted F.C. players
Chesham United F.C. players
Ware F.C. players
English Football League players
National League (English football) players
Redbridge F.C. players